The Halifax Independent School (HIS) is an independent, coeducational day school with a curriculum from Pre-school through Grade 9. It is located in Halifax, Nova Scotia, Canada.

Programme

The Theme-based learning curriculum 
Theme-based learning was pioneered over 20 years ago at Halifax Independent School on the Dalhousie University campus. The core of the programme is the in-depth study of various topics, under the umbrella of the larger "theme" and in which all the traditional core subjects are integrated. In working through theme, the students learn to question, analyse, classify and present their discoveries.

Pre-school 
Halifax Independent School offers a school preparatory, play-based pre-school programme from September through July, for children turning 4 years of age by December 31. Licensed by the Nova Scotia Department of Community Services, the Pre-school's ratio of students to teachers is 8:1 with a minimum of 2/3 of the teaching staff certified as early childhood educators.

The Pre-school programme includes age-appropriate instruction in Math, Language Arts, Science, Social Studies, Art, Music, French, Physical Education and Swimming. Pre-school students are given two snacks and a full lunch.

Elementary school

Mixed-Age Classrooms, Class Names and Programme Specifics 
To reinforce the understanding that mixed-age groupings were not simply split classes, the school's first students were encouraged to establish names for their classes that did not make reference to conventional grades. The list of names has expanded with the programme offerings at the school, and the current list is as follows:
 "Youngs" Primary
 "Middles" includes students in Grades 1 and 2
 "Olds" includes students in Grades 3 and 4
 "Elders" includes students in Grades 5 and 6

The Elementary programme includes age-appropriate instruction in Math, Language Arts, Science, Social Studies, Art, Music (The core music curriculum is supplemented with Choir, Recorder, Ukulele, and band in grade 6), French, Physical Education and Swimming.

Middle school 
Limited to 20 students per class, the middle school (grades 7 through 9) includes instruction in Math, English Language Arts, Social Studies, Science, Fine Art, Music (Middle School Choir, Band, Jazz Choir), French (Extended Core French SEVEC), and Physical Education.

Recent Middle School Theatrical Productions include:
 All the World's a Stage (excerpts)
 Twelfth Night 
 A Midsummer Night's Dream
 The Compleat Wrks of Wllm Shkspr (very abridged)
 Back to the 80's
 Treasure Island
 Our Town
 The Boyfriend
 Much Ado About Nothing

Origins 
2004 - Halifax Independent School
1998 - Halifax Independent Elementary School
1992 - The Dalhousie Cooperative School
1972 - Dalhousie University, Faculty of Education - Dalhousie University Elementary School

Governance 
The school is operated by the Halifax Independent School Society, via its board of directors. The board of directors is composed of a combination of parents and staff, such that the number of parents on the board exceeds the number of staff members by one.
The board of directors currently consists of 11 members. Permanent staff members serve by rotation and parents are chosen by election at general membership meetings.

Charitable status 
Halifax Independent School Society is a not-for-profit society incorporated and registered under the Registry of Joint Stocks Companies. Its Charity Business number is 87165 5262 RR0001.

References

External links 
 http://www.halifaxindependentschool.ns.ca - official site

Elementary schools in Nova Scotia